Muhammad: The Messenger of God may refer to:

Muhammad: The Messenger of God (book), by Betty Kelen
Muhammad: The Messenger of God (film), a 2015 Iranian film
Muhammad: The Messenger of God (soundtrack), a soundtrack album from the film

See also
Muhammed